DeLisi is a surname. Notable people with that surname include:

Charles DeLisi, Metcalf Professor of Science and Engineering at Boston University
Lynn DeLisi, American psychiatrist
Matt DeLisi, American sociologist
Scott H. DeLisi, United States Ambassador to Uganda
Will DeLisi, Computer Science Engineer

See also

Ben de Lisi, American fashion designer